Mr. Freeze was originally a comic book character and Batman's adversary, but has been substantially adapted from the comics into various forms of media, including feature films, television series, and video games. The character has been portrayed in live-action by George Sanders, Otto Preminger, and Eli Wallach in the Batman television series; by Arnold Schwarzenegger in the 1997 film Batman & Robin; and by Nathan Darrow on the Fox crime series Gotham. He has also been voiced by Michael Ansara in the DC Animated Universe and by Maurice LaMarche in the Batman: Arkham video game franchise.

Television

Live-action

 A variation of Mr. Freeze appeared in the 1960s Batman television series, portrayed by George Sanders in his first two-part appearance, Otto Preminger in the second, and Eli Wallach in the third. This version is "Dr. Art Schivel", who speaks with an Austrian German accent and became Mr. Freeze after Batman inadvertently exposed him to cryogenic chemicals amidst an attempted arrest. Additionally, following his first two-part appearance, Freeze wears a "Freeze Collar" around his neck along with his refrigerated suit. Similarly to the comics and before Mr. Freeze appeared in the series, he was initially called "Mr. Zero".
 Mr. Freeze appears in Gotham, portrayed by Nathan Darrow. Introduced in the episode "A Dead Man Feels No Cold", this version's surname is pronounced "" and, like the Batman: The Animated Series and most subsequent versions, is a scientist who researches cryogenic technology to find a cure for his wife Nora Fries's terminal illness. To this end, he freezes Gotham's citizens with a cryogenic gun and uses them as test subjects. Horrified at what Victor has become, Nora indirectly kills herself during one of the experiments. Devastated, Fries attempts suicide via his cryogenic gun, but survives and is rendered unable to survive outside of sub-zero temperatures. Hugo Strange has him declared dead and takes him to Arkham Asylum, where the former uses him as an "assistant" in experiments with cryogenically frozen bodies. In the episode "Transference", Strange orders Fries to kill Selina Kyle, but Bridgit Pike, another of Strange's genetically altered minions, interferes. In the episode "The Primal Riddle", crime bosses Oswald Cobblepot and Ivy Pepper find Fries in the Arctic and persuade him to help Cobblepot get revenge on fellow criminal Edward Nygma by returning his suit and promising a cure for his condition. Fries continues to work for Cobblepot in subsequent episodes before joining the Legion of Horribles. After Jeremiah Valeska destroys the bridges leading to Gotham City and declares it a "no man's land", Fries becomes a crime boss in his own right and goes to war with Pike's gang for control of the Burnley district of Gotham.

Animation

DC Animated Universe

Mr. Freeze appears in series set in the DC Animated Universe, voiced by Michael Ansara.
 The character first appears in Batman: The Animated Series with a design created by Hellboy creator Mike Mignola, per series creator Bruce Timm's request. This version was a scientist working for GothCorp who embezzled funds to cryogenically freeze his terminally ill wife Nora Fries until a cure could be found for her condition. When GothCorp's corrupt CEO Ferris Boyle interfered, Fries was accidentally exposed to cryogenic chemicals that mutated him into a metahuman unable to live outside of sub-zero conditions and forced him to wear a cryogenic suit to survive. Introduced in the Emmy Award-winning episode "Heart of Ice", Freeze attempts to exact vengeance against Boyle for the accident, leading to his first confrontation with Batman as Freeze steals parts for a freeze cannon that he intends to use in his vendetta. Batman later discovers the truth of Freeze's origin, foils his plot, and exposes Boyle's crimes before leaving them both for the police, with Freeze remanded to a specially modified cell at Arkham Asylum. In the episode "Deep Freeze", Freeze is kidnapped by billionaire amusement park designer Grant Walker, who seeks to become immortal like Freeze and create a frozen world for select residents in exchange for helping Freeze cure Nora. However, Batman convinces Freeze that Nora would resent him for his actions if he agreed, leading to Freeze turning on Walker and trapping them and Nora in icebergs.
 Freeze also appears in The New Batman Adventures episode "Cold Comfort". Following the events of Batman & Mr. Freeze: SubZero and a cured Nora leaving him for another doctor, Freeze discovered his mutation is slowly degrading his body. With the help of the Ice Maidens, three parka-wearing henchwomen who also use freeze guns, he kidnaps three scientists to try and stop the process, though they only succeed in saving his head. Vowing to take away what others value most, he attempts to destroy Gotham City with a "reverse fusion bomb", only to be confronted by Batman and Batgirl. While fighting the former, Freeze is attached to the bomb, dropped in the Gotham River, and presumed dead in the resulting explosion, though he goes missing.
 Freeze also appears in the Batman Beyond episode "Meltdown". Due to cryogenic technology, Freeze's head survived the intervening decades between this series and The New Batman Adventures. Seeking a means to restore his human body following his own mutation, Derek Powers enlists Dr. Stephanie Lake to clone Freeze a new body built from his baseline DNA without his sub-zero biology. Recognizing that he has a second chance at life, Freeze attempts to right some of his past wrongs with the new Batman's help, despite the original's mistrust and seemingly enters a relationship with Lake until his new body soon begins to revert to his original body's biology. He informs Lake, who tries to kill him so she can biopsy his organs for Powers. Realizing they had betrayed him, Freeze escapes and later returns with an advanced suit of sub-zero armor that he kept in "cold storage" over the years to kill Lake and Powers, though the latter's abilities allow him to fight back. Following a fight with Powers and Batman, Freeze commits suicide and stops the latter from saving him, recognizing that Batman was the only one who genuinely cared for him.

Other series

 Mr. Freeze appeared in The Batman/Superman Hour, voiced by Ted Knight.
 Mr. Freeze appears in The New Adventures of Batman episode "The Deep Freeze", voiced by Lennie Weinrib. This version is depicted without his helmet, which he wears in the series' opening sequence, and is assisted by a henchman named Professor Frost.
 Mr. Freeze appears in The Batman, voiced by Clancy Brown. This version is a diamond thief who was accidentally electrocuted in a cryogenic laboratory chamber, transforming him into a cryokinetic metahuman capable of firing ice blasts from his hands and generating extreme cold around him. Additionally, he forced a scientist to create a cryogenic suit to contain his condition. Following his debut in the episode "The Big Chill", he battles Batman on several occasions, with some of these encounters involving other supervillains such as Firefly, the Penguin, and Rumor, among others. In a possible future depicted in the episode "Artifacts", Freeze's powers have increased significantly, forcing him to use a special exosuit due to his lower body having been replaced with mechanical spider legs sometime prior.
 Mr. Freeze and Mr. Zero appear as separate characters in Batman: The Brave and the Bold, with the former voiced by John DiMaggio while the latter is silent. The series' version of Freeze is a criminal scientist based in Gotham City who was exposed to an experimental cryogenic chemical while fighting Batman. Due to his molecular structure being frozen, Freeze is forced to wear a special suit to regulate his body temperature so that it remains 50 degrees below zero.
 Mr. Freeze appears in Young Justice, voiced by Keith Szarabajka.
 Mr. Freeze appears in Justice League Action, voiced by Peter Stormare. This version's design resembles that of The New Batman Adventures incarnation.
 Mr. Freeze appears in Teen Titans Go!. This version's design is based on that of The New Batman Adventures incarnation. Additionally, a version of him inspired by the Night King appears in the episode "Where Exactly on the Globe is Carl Sandpedro? Part 4".
 Mr. Freeze appears in the DC Super Hero Girls short "#TheLateBatsby", voiced by John de Lancie.
 Mr. Freeze appears in Harley Quinn, voiced by Alfred Molina. This version resembles his New 52 counterpart and speaks with a Spanish accent. Debuting in the season two premiere, "New Gotham", he has joined forces with former Legion of Doom members the Penguin, Riddler, Two-Face, and Bane to form the Injustice League and take advantage of the chaos the Joker caused when he destroyed Gotham City. They divide the city's ruins between them, but refuse to give Harley Quinn an equal share, leading her to attempt to dismantle the League. Freeze traps her in a block of ice when she resists, which he later reveals was his way of sparing her as the other Leaguers wanted to kill her, and lets Penguin keep her to use as an attraction in his Iceberg Lounge until her crew free her two months later. In the episode "Thawing Hearts", Harley and her crew target Freeze, but he captures them and forces them to help him cure Nora. Poison Ivy succeeds in creating a cure, but due to Nora's rare blood type, someone else has to take it, then give Nora a blood transfusion, which will, in turn, kill that person. Freeze opts to sacrifice himself for his wife.
 Mr. Freeze appears in Batwheels, voiced by Regi Davis. This version is African-American.

Film

Live-action

 Mr. Freeze appears in Batman & Robin, portrayed by Arnold Schwarzenegger. This version became Mr. Freeze following an accident in a cryogenics lab he was using to find a cure for his terminally ill wife Nora Fries and is now dependent on a diamond-powered sub-zero suit to survive. Additionally, he displays a propensity for making cold- and ice-related puns and is assisted by ice hockey player-themed henchmen. While stealing diamonds to assist in his efforts to cure Nora, he comes into conflict with Batman, Robin, and later Batgirl. Freeze forms an alliance with Poison Ivy and Bane. However, Ivy deceives him into believing Batman cut off Nora's life support, inciting him into launching a plot to freeze Gotham City. After Batman, Robin, and Batgirl foil the plot, save Nora, and reveal the truth to Freeze, he and Ivy are incarcerated in Arkham Asylum, where Freeze continues his research to save Nora and exact revenge on Ivy. Patrick Stewart was considered for the role, before the script was rewritten to accommodate Schwarzenegger's casting. Schumacher decided that Mr. Freeze must be "big and strong like he was chiseled out of a glacier". Schwarzenegger was paid a $25 million salary for the role. His prosthetic makeup and wardrobe took six hours to apply each day. The Mr. Freeze armor suit was made by armorer Terry English.
 The Batman & Robin incarnation of Mr. Freeze makes a cameo appearance in Space Jam: A New Legacy as a spectator of the Tune Squad and Goon Squad's basketball game.

Animation
 The DC Animated Universe incarnation of Mr. Freeze appears in Batman & Mr. Freeze: SubZero, voiced again by Michael Ansara. Following the events of Batman: The Animated Series, Freeze established a home for himself in the Arctic and a surrogate family with his cryogenically frozen wife Nora Fries, his newly adopted Inuit son Koonak, and a pair of pet polar bears, Notchka and Shaka, who serve as his muscle. After Nora's cryogenic chamber is accidentally shattered by a submarine, Freeze kills the crew in anger, seeks help from former colleague Gregory Belson, and kidnaps Barbara Gordon to harvest her organs in an attempt to save Nora. After Freeze and Belson explain the situation to Barbara, she agrees to help them by giving Nora a blood transfusion, on the condition that they do it at a hospital. However, Freeze imprisons her in an abandoned oil platform. Batman and Robin infiltrate the platform to save Barbara, but fight Freeze and Belson, who accidentally sets the platform ablaze. Growing desperate, Freeze orders Belson to perform the operation, but the latter attempts to escape, only to be killed by falling wreckage. Coming to his senses, Freeze allows the heroes to save Barbara, Koonak, and Nora and escape while Freeze falls into the ocean, is presumed dead, and secretly rescued by Notchka and Shaka. As Freeze reaches the North Pole, he learns Wayne Enterprises saved Nora and peacefully walks off with his polar bears.
 Mr. Freeze makes a non-speaking appearance in Superman/Batman: Public Enemies. This version wears a purple hood and is a member of the "Cold Warriors" alongside Icicle Jr., Killer Frost, and Captain Cold.
 Mr. Freeze appears in DC Super Friends: The Joker's Playhouse, voiced by Eric Bauza.
 An alternate universe version of Victor Fries appears in Justice League: Gods and Monsters, voiced by Jim Meskimen. This version was a Nobel Prize-winning thermal expert and a member of Lex Luthor's "Project Fair Play", a contingency program meant to destroy their universe's Justice League if necessary before Fries is killed by a Metal Man designed to resemble and frame Batman.
 Mr. Freeze appears in Batman Unlimited: Mechs vs. Mutants, voiced by Oded Fehr. This version exiled himself to the Arctic as he despises humanity until the Penguin tricks him into coming back to Gotham and mutate Killer Croc and Chemo.
 The 1960s Batman TV series incarnation of Mr. Freeze makes a non-speaking cameo appearance in Batman: Return of the Caped Crusaders and its sequel Batman vs. Two-Face. This version resembles an orange-haired version of Eli Wallach's depiction of Freeze.
 Mr. Freeze appears in The Lego Batman Movie, voiced by David Burrows. This version resembles the incarnation seen in Batman: The Animated Series and operates a robotic mech equipped with a freeze gun.
 Mr. Freeze appears in Scooby-Doo! & Batman: The Brave and the Bold.
 Mr. Freeze appears in Batman vs. Teenage Mutant Ninja Turtles, voiced by John DiMaggio. Similarly to the comics, this version is mutated into a polar bear while imprisoned in Arkham Asylum, though the Joker carries out the mutation instead. Additionally, Freeze fights Robin, Raphael, and Michelangelo before he is mauled by a mutated Batman.
 Mr. Freeze makes a cameo appearance in Batman: Hush. This version resembles the incarnation seen in Young Justice.

Video games

Lego DC series

 Mr. Freeze appears as a boss in Lego Batman: The Video Game, with his vocal effects provided by Ogie Banks. This version's design resembles that of the Batman: The Animated Series incarnation, serves as a follower of the Riddler, and is capable of raising an army of Freeze Maids.
 Mr. Freeze appears as a boss and unlockable playable character in Lego Batman 2: DC Super Heroes, voiced by Townsend Coleman.
 Mr. Freeze appears as a boss and playable character in Lego Batman 3: Beyond Gotham, voiced by Liam O'Brien impersonating Arnold Schwarzenegger's interpretation of the character. Additionally, the Batman Beyond incarnation of Mr. Freeze appears as a playable DLC character.
 Mr. Freeze appears as an unlockable playable character in Lego DC Super-Villains, voiced by Eric Bauza. This version resembles the New 52 incarnation.

Batman: Arkham
Mr. Freeze appears in the Batman: Arkham series, voiced by Maurice LaMarche.
 According to writer Paul Dini, Freeze was meant to appear in Batman: Arkham Asylum, but was dropped due to not fitting in the game. Despite this, Freeze's icicle-covered cell and bio appear in the game.
 Freeze appears as a boss in Batman: Arkham City. Following the events of Arkham Asylum, Freeze was imprisoned in the titular Arkham City, where he established a base for himself in the Gotham City Police Department (GCPD)'s original headquarters until he was captured by the Penguin. After being poisoned by the Joker, Batman seeks out Freeze for a cure. Upon rescuing him from the Penguin and procuring a sample of Ra's al Ghul's blood for the cure, Freeze manufactures two vials of it, but stores one in a safe and destroys the other, demanding Batman rescue Nora from the Joker. Batman eventually defeats Freeze, whereupon both learn Harley Quinn stole the remaining vial. Freeze gives Batman freeze grenades to help him retrieve the cure and save Nora, both of which Batman eventually succeeds in.
 A younger Freeze appears as the final boss of the Batman: Arkham Origins DLC "Cold, Cold Heart". Sometime prior, Victor Fries worked for GothCorp as part of a secret cryogenic weapons program in exchange for help from GothCorp CEO Ferris Boyle in curing Nora until he realized Boyle did not intend to uphold his side of the deal. Victor tried to save Nora himself, only for Boyle to attack him, inadvertently turning him into Mr. Freeze, and kidnap Nora. Due to his mutated metabolism, Freeze built himself a sub-zero suit and used a super-coolant he had developed to survive and go on a violent quest to get Nora back. In the present, Freeze joins forces with the Penguin to kidnap Boyle. Batman later confronts Freeze and Boyle, helping the former come to his senses and knocking out the latter before he can kill Freeze and Nora. Following this, Freeze, Penguin, and Boyle are arrested by the GCPD.
 Freeze appears in the Batman: Arkham Knight "Season of Infamy" DLC side mission "In From The Cold". After discovering a frozen vessel off the Gotham coastline, Batman discovers Freeze, who reveals the Arkham Knight's militia kidnapped Nora after he refused to help him and Scarecrow in their plot to kill Batman. Batman eventually finds Nora, but is forced to awaken her due to her damaged cryo-chamber. To Batman and Freeze's surprise, Nora refuses to return to cryogenic stasis as she simply wants to spend time with Freeze. Upon reuniting, Freeze removes his helmet and leaves Gotham with Nora to spend their last days together in peace.
 Freeze appears as an unlockable playable character in Batman: Arkham Underworld.

Other games
 Mr. Freeze appears as a boss in the Batman: The Animated Series tie-in game.
 Mr. Freeze appears as the final boss of the Sega Genesis version of The Adventures of Batman & Robin.
 Mr. Freeze appears as the final boss of the Batman & Robin film tie-in game.
 Mr. Freeze appears as the first boss of Batman: Chaos in Gotham.
 Mr. Freeze appears in Batman Vengeance, voiced again by Michael Ansara.
 Mr. Freeze makes a cameo appearance in Batman: Rise of Sin Tzu. 
 Mr. Freeze appears as a boss in Batman: Dark Tomorrow.
 Mr. Freeze appears in the PC game Batman: Toxic Chill.
 Mr. Freeze appears as a boss in DC Universe Online, voiced by Robert Kraft. This version is served by a metahuman right-hand man named Coldcut as well as Icers, Kelvinizers, Repair Engineers, Thermanators, Chillers, Deep Freezers, Ice Picks, Crazed Coolers, Ice Breakers, Ice Makers, Ice Giants, Ice Behemoths, and Ice Shardlings.
 Mr. Freeze appears in the Batman arcade game. This version possesses a giant mech.
 Mr. Freeze appears as a "Premier Skin" for Captain Cold in Injustice 2, voiced by Jim Pirri. This version resembles his New 52 counterpart, speaks with a German accent, and initially lacked a helmet, which was added in a later update.
 Mr. Freeze appears in Batman: The Enemy Within, voiced by Matthew Mercer. This version is not entirely confined to a sub-zero suit, which lacks the glass dome of most iterations of Freeze, and wields a cryo-gauntlet instead of a freeze gun. Additionally, he is a member of the Pact who seeks to use the LOTUS virus to cure Nora. While working with the Pact, Freeze mercilessly kills dozens of people in pursuit of his goal until he is betrayed by either Bruce Wayne or Harley Quinn depending on the player's choices, infected with the LOTUS virus, and abandoned by his allies.
 Mr. Freeze appears as a boss in Gotham Knights, voiced by Donald Chang.

Miscellaneous
 A character inspired by Mr. Freeze called Dora Smithy appears in the third season of Gotham Girls, voiced by Jennifer Hale. She is Freeze's sister-in-law who blames him for her sister Nora Fries' death and uses his equipment to seek revenge as well as put an end to Gotham City's costumed supervillains. Throughout the series, Smithy works as Commissioner Gordon's secretary while secretly committing several crimes and slowly making all of Gotham's men vanish. After she kidnaps Gordon and replaces him with a robotic duplicate, Batgirl eventually defeats Smithy, who falls into a vat of cryo chemicals and becomes unable to survive outside of sub-zero environments like Freeze before she is incarcerated in Arkham Asylum.
 The DC Animated Universe incarnation of Mr. Freeze appears in Justice League Adventures #12 as a member of the Cold Warriors.
 Mr. Freeze appears in DC Super Friends #16 as a member of the Ice Pack.
 Mr. Freeze appears in Smallville Season 11. This version joined Intergang to obtain money to fund further research towards saving his wife Nora Fries and became brainwashed by the Prankster. While working for Intergang, Freeze kills Joe Chill and frames Batman for it. Prankster later uses Freeze in an attempt to destroy Metropolis' water purification plant, but is foiled by Superman while Batman and Green Arrow defeat Freeze, who is sent to Arkham Asylum. While imprisoned, he and his fellow inmates receive yellow power rings from Parallax and temporarily become Yellow Lanterns until Professor Emil Hamilton reboots the rings, de-powering the inmates.
 Mr. Freeze appears in the Injustice: Gods Among Us prequel comic. Having gone into hiding for five years while Superman builds his Regime, Freeze is eventually captured by Killer Croc and detained in a prison within Gotham's sewers before he is rescued by Harley Quinn and her Joker Clan.

References

Batman in other media
Fictional Austrian people